"What You're Proposing" is a single released by the British rock band Status Quo in 1980. It was included on their album Just Supposin'.

The B-side is "A B Blues", a non-album instrumental studio jam. Some later pressings of this single mis-credited Andy Bown as Andy Brown on the B-side composer's credit. The initial pressing run of 75,000 copies of this single were issued with a colour picture sleeve.

The song was reprised, in 2014, for the band's thirty-first studio album Aquostic (Stripped Bare). It was featured in the ninety-minute launch performance of the album at London's Roundhouse on 22 October, the concert being recorded and broadcast live by BBC Radio 2 as part of their In Concert series.

Track listing 
 "What You're Proposing" (Rossi/Frost) (4.13)
 "A B Blues" (Rossi/Parfitt/Lancaster/Coghlan/Bown) (4.33)

Charts

References 

Status Quo (band) songs
1980 singles
Songs written by Francis Rossi
1980 songs
Vertigo Records singles